Van Voorst is a Dutch toponymic surname meaning "from Voorst". Notable people with the surname include:

Carol van Voorst, American diplomat
Gerrit van Voorst (1910–1986), Dutch swimmer
John Van Voorst (1804–1898), English publisher
Robert E. Van Voorst (born 1952), American theologian and educator

See also
 Van Voorst tot Voorst

Dutch-language surnames
Surnames of Dutch origin